Benut-e Bala (also Romanized as Benūt-e Bālā and Bonūt-e Bālā; also known as Shahrak-e Benūt-e Mogharrī) is a village in Choghamish Rural District, Choghamish District, Dezful County, Khuzestan Province, Iran. At the  census, its population was 1,016, in 209 families.

References 

Populated places in Dezful County